David Charles Coon (born 28 October 1956 in Toronto, Ontario) is a Canadian politician, who was elected to the Legislative Assembly of New Brunswick in the 2014 provincial election to represent the provincial electoral district of Fredericton South.

Coon became the first elected Green MLA in New Brunswick history, the third Green parliamentarian elected in Canada, and has served as the Leader of the Green Party of New Brunswick since winning the leadership of his party in 2012.

Coon resides in Fredericton, NB with his wife Janice Harvey, and daughters Caroline and Laura Coon.

Biology and conservation work

A biologist by training, Coon worked as an environmental educator, organizer, activist and manager for 33 years, 28 of those years with the Conservation Council of New Brunswick.

Coon has also provided education and training in energy efficient home renovation and home-based renewable energy systems, writing a regular column for the Globe and Mail on the topic. During his time as Policy Director at the Conservation Council, Mr. Coon's work to protect drinking water led to the creation of New Brunswick's Clean Water Act and to the province's Petroleum Product Handling and Storage Regulation. This earned the New Brunswick environmental organization the United Nations Environmental Programme's Global 500 award. He was later awarded a silver medallion from the Canadian Environmental Achievement Awards for his work in advancing public policy on climate change, both provincially and nationally.

Coon has advocated for community-based ecological resource management and land use. He worked with commercial fishermen's organizations to establish the Bay of Fundy Fisheries Council to advance community-based fishery management. His collaboration with the National Farmers Union helped create the first agricultural conservation club in New Brunswick.

He was a founding director of Canada's first community supported agricultural initiative, Harvest Share Co-operative on Keswick Ridge, and co-founded the New Brunswick Community Land Trust.

Political career
Coon ran for the seat of Fredericton South in the Legislative Assembly in the 2014 provincial election, winning the vote. He is the second member of a provincial Green Party to win a seat in a provincial legislature, following Andrew Weaver in British Columbia.

Since his election in 2014, Coon has introduced private member's bills aimed at increasing local food security and expanding local agriculture, creating jobs in energy efficient building renovations and renewable energy, lowering the voting age, protecting citizens against frivolous lawsuits. He has championed improving access to both mental and primary health care, alleviating poverty, the provision of midwifery services, climate action, and forest management that is socially and ecologically sound. He had a bill passed to ensure students in the public school system learn about historical and contemporary relationships with First Nations; implementing one of the Calls to Action of the Truth and Reconciliation Commission.

Coon was successful in securing all party support for adding a code of conduct and a statement on the roles and responsibilities for MLAs to the Standing Rules of the Legislative Assembly.

He has served as a member of the Standing Committee on Estimates and Fiscal Policy, the Standing Committee on Procedure, Privileges and Legislative Officers, and the Legislative Administration Committee. He also served as a member of the Select Committee on Climate Change, whose recommendations formed the basis of New Brunswick's Climate Action Plan.

In the 2018 provincial election, the Green party under Coon elected three MLAs. In the 2020 provincial election, those three MLAs were all re-elected including Coon.

See also 
List of Green party leaders in Canada

References

External links

Green Party of New Brunswick

Living people
1956 births
Leaders of the Green Party of New Brunswick
Green Party of New Brunswick MLAs
Politicians from Toronto
Canadian biologists
Politicians from Fredericton
21st-century Canadian politicians
Canadian conservationists